Calosoma tanganyikae is a species of ground beetle in the subfamily of Carabinae. It was described by Jeannel in 1940.

References

tanganyikae
Beetles described in 1940